Cordylospasta is a genus of blister beetles in the family Meloidae. There are at least two described species in Cordylospasta.

Species
These two species belong to the genus Cordylospasta:
 Cordylospasta fulleri Horn, 1875
 Cordylospasta opaca (Horn, 1868)

References

Further reading

 
 
 

Meloidae
Articles created by Qbugbot